Cerium(IV) hydroxide, also known as ceric hydroxide, is an inorganic compound with the chemical formula Ce(OH)4. It is a yellowish powder that is insoluble in water but soluble in concentrated acids.

Production
Cerium(IV) hydroxide can be produced by reacting cerium(III) carbonate and acetic acid, then oxidizing it with hydrogen peroxide in base. The reactions are:
 Ce2(CO3)3 + 6 CH3COOH → 2 Ce(CH3COO)3 + 3 CO2↑ + 3 H2O
 2 Ce(CH3COO)3 + 3 H2O2 + 4 H2O → 2 Ce(OH)3(OOH) + 6 CH3COOH
 CH3COOH + NaOH → CH3COONa + H2O
 2 Ce(OH)3(OOH) → 2 Ce(OH)4↓ + O2↑
The net equation is：
 Ce2(CO3)3 + 6 CH3COOH + 3 H2O2 + 6 NaOH —343 K→ 2 Ce(OH)4 + 6 CH3COONa + O2↑ + 3 CO2↑ + 5 H2O
If using cerium(III) nitrate as ingredient,  a similar reaction occurs:
 2 Ce(NO3)3 + 3 H2O2 + 6 NH3·H2O → 2 Ce(OH)3(OOH)↓ + 6 NH4NO3 + 2 H2O
 Ce(OH)3(OOH) —Δ→ 2 Ce(OH)4↓ + O2↑
It might also prepared by addition of sodium hydroxide or ammonium hydroxide to a Ce4+ solution, being obtained as a gelatinous precipitate described as CeO2·xH2O, (x = 0.5–2). Boiling an insoluble Ce4+ salt in NaOH gives granular Ce(OH)4.

References 

Cerium(IV) compounds
Hydroxides